Karachi Urban Transport Corporation (KUTC) is a municipal agency responsible for planning and integrating road transport and public transport in the Metropolitan Karachi area. It has assumed other key initiatives including the construction of the Karachi Circular Railway and Karachi BRT as well as multiple other projects supporting public transport in the city.

History
KUTC was registered on 8 May 2008 in Securities & Exchange Commission of Pakistan (SECP) as Public Limited Company. Pakistan Railways 60%, Government of Sindh 25% and City District Government Karachi has 15% share in this corporation.

Projects

Karachi Circular Railway

Karachi Metrobus

References 

 Transport
Railway companies of Pakistan
Companies of Pakistan
Government-owned companies of Pakistan
Government agencies of Sindh